HC Škoda Plzeň is a professional Czech ice hockey team based in Plzeň, Czech Republic. It currently plays in the Czech Extraliga. Their home arena is Logspeed CZ Arena. The traditional ice hockey club was founded in 1929. In 2013, for the first time in history, HC Plzeň were the Czech Extraliga champions after beating Zlín 4:3 in the seventh match of the dramatic final. HC Škoda Plzeň, New Arena name is LogSpeed CZ Arena Plzeň.

Club names
 1929 – Hokejový klub při SK (Sportovní klub) Viktoria Plzeň
 1948 – Sokol Plzeň IV
 1949 – ZSJ Škodovy závody
 1952 – ZSJ Leninovy závody
 1953 – Spartak Plzeň LZ
 1965 – TJ Škoda Plzeň
 1991 – HC Škoda Plzeň
 1994 – HC Interconnex Plzeň
 1995 – HC ZKZ Plzeň
 1997 – HC Keramika Plzeň
 2003 – HC Lasselsberger Plzeň
 2009 – HC Plzeň 1929
 2012 – HC Škoda Plzeň

Honours
 Czechoslovak First Ice Hockey League - Runner-up (1958,1959,1992) Third place (1957)
 Czech Extraliga - Champion (2013), Third Place (2000,2012) Presidents Trophy (2010)

Famous Players
 Vladimír Bednář
 Bohuslav Ebermann
 Milan Kajkl
 Jiří Kučera
 Dušan Salfický
 Martin Straka
 Petr Sýkora
 Jaroslav Špaček
 Tuukka Rask
 Dominik Kubalik

Players

Current roster

Arena
Home Monitoring Aréna was built at 1969 and currently holds 8,236 people.

Controversy
During the 2010–2011 season, the team was docked 19 points for having used players who were not correctly registered to the club, an affair which also involved the clubs BK Mladá Boleslav and HC Kladno.

References

External links
 Official website 
 HC Plzeň at hockeyarenas.net

See also
:Category:HC Plzeň players

Ice hockey clubs established in 1929
Plzeň
Plzeň
Sport in Plzeň
1929 establishments in Czechoslovakia